Philip Morris MBE (born 1972) Former British army soldier who is a two-time testicular cancer survivor and founder of Testicular cancer UK, who works to spread awareness and most importantly emotional support for the disease on the Internet using online forums and social networking. He is also a cancer documentary producer having made films that guide men through cancer. He also is an official for the British boxing board of control.

Born in Heswall in 1972, he was educated at Pensby high school where he was friends with former Pro footballer Graham Branch. He only discovered in 2019 that he has Double deficit dyslexia after hiding since his teenage years that he struggled to read and write. 

He is the younger brother of Kerry Drumm the award-winning Australian director and playwright.

He served in the British Army from 1990 where he served in Germany and operations in various areas such as Belfast. Phil was a member of the 1 ADTR and 2CS boxing teams fighting at welterweight. Unfortunately, he regrettably had to leave in 1996 with a back injury which he describes as the worst day of his life.

After being diagnosed with testicular cancer in 2002, he set up Check Em Lads,  now renamed Testicular cancer UK a cancer organisation to help men under 35 suffering from this medical condition. Although the website was initially set up to help men from the UK it's now used and respected by men across the globe. Some leading oncologists recognise his website and support service in the UK and the United States. Phil is looked up to by thousands of survivors across the globe who look at him as one of the first survivors to help men going through cancer

Many new testicular cancer charities across the globe have said they wanted to be as influential as Phil and offer the same support to men in their countries as Testicular cancer UK has in the UK.

His cancer returned in 2015 as stage 3 seminoma. Phil is one of the leading campaigners and influencers in the post-testicular cancer condition Hypogonadism and mental health issues. 

In 2013, Check Em Lads was renamed https://www.testicularcanceruk.com Testicular Cancer UK.

Awards

The David Cameron award in 2013, for innovation in male cancers
 
MBE from Her majesty Queen Elizabeth in June 2021.

Notice of Order of the British Empire  https://www.thegazette.co.uk/notice/3818160

References

External links
 Testicular Cancer UK
Linkedin https://uk.linkedin.com/in/phil-morris-mbe-48967343
Notice of Most Excellent Order of the British Empire https://www.thegazette.co.uk/notice/3818160

British health activists
Living people
1972 births
People from Heswall